EC Red Bull Salzburg is a professional ice hockey team based in Salzburg, Austria, that currently plays in the ICE Hockey League. The club play their home games at the Eisarena Salzburg.

History
The history of ice hockey in Salzburg at the highest level dates back to 1977–78, when the then HC Salzburg took a sensational third place in the first division. Influential players such as Rick Cunningham and Roger Lamoureux (both Canadians) helped to massively increase the popularity of Salzburg ice hockey, and in December 1977 saw the ice rink sold out for the first time. Ten years later in 1988, the Salzburg ice hockey club, now known as Salzburg EC, were once again on course for the title. With strong players such as the Russians Viktor Schalimow and Sergej Kapustin or fine-sounding names such as Greg Holst from Canada or Vienna's Peter Znenahlik, an exciting winter in the "Volksgarten" could be expected. After a strong season which included spell at the top in the preliminary round standings, Salzburg failed to take its first Bundesliga championship, and its ailing economic situation eventually saw the relegation of SEC from the first division.

EC Salzburg were founded in 1995 by the merger of two small clubs EC Morzg and EC Tiefenbach. The EC Morzg originally arose after the bankruptcy of Salzburg EC in 1988 as a refuge for the youth players. Shortly after the foundation, the company Kaindl presented the club with its first major sponsor and the club was renamed to Kaindl EC Salzburg. From the beginning of 2000, drinks manufacturer Red Bull became the team's major sponsor and the club again changed names to represent EC The Red Bulls Salzburg. It was later transitioned to EC Red Bull Salzburg in 2005.

2000–04
Strengthened by players such as Canadian Sheldon Moser and Brian McCarthy of the US, the Red Bulls became champions of the Oberliga as quickly as the 2000–01 season (the Oberliga was then the equivalent of the second division), but weren't quite yet ready for the highest level. Until three years later, that is. The Red Bulls fought their way back to the championship in the Nationalliga, ending the Salzburg ice hockey club's 16 years of absence from the Bundesliga.

2004–06
After increasing the squad intensively – in Austria's ice hockey history, the Salzburg ice hockey club first competed in the Nationalliga with a farm team – the Red Bulls had to learn the hard way in the first Bundesliga season of "recent times", although they did show their potential. Following seventh and last place in the preliminary rounds of the season which saw them promoted, team formation enjoyed an ever more professional environment, and in the second year following promotion, the Red Bulls found themselves in the final of the Erste Bank ice hockey league. In the end, however, they lost to VSV, taking the runner-up spot in the sixth game of the best-of-seven series.

2006–07
Salzburg were finally rewarded in their third 1st division season. After a fabulous regular season contested by eight teams, where the Red Bulls conceded just one out of 28 home games, Salzburg went on to put in a sterling performance in the play-offs as well. Following three successive victories over the Vienna Capitals in the semi-final (best of five), the Red Bulls conceded just one game in the final against VSV in Villach, sealing Salzburg's first ever Austrian ice hockey championship with a score of 4:1 on wins (best of seven).
The finals games in Villach, where VSV were backed by an incredibly enthusiastic crowd, their seventh man, were particularly tough. The secret of their success was consistency, the team having been perfectly prepped by head coach Hardy Nilsson. The 59-year-old Swede subsequently retired from active coaching, celebrating the Red Bulls' title and his tenth championship as a coach.

2007–08
For their fourth 1st division season, the Red Bulls were joined in Salzburg by new head coach and sporting director Pierre Pagé as well as a number of new international coaches. In addition to non-playing staff, future captain Stuart Mercer was drafted into the side after a home video being seen on YouTube of him demonstrating 'Phil Harrison-esque tekkers' at Hutton Grammar School. On 25 September 2007, in preparation for the new season, Red Bull played an exhibition match against National Hockey League team, the Los Angeles Kings, losing in an entertaining 7-6 contest. In his first few months, the 59-year-old Canadian helped set up the International Ice Hockey Development Model (IIDM), laying the foundations for the development of up-and-coming junior players, and also took the unprecedented step of heavily integrating young players into the 1st division squad.

After a regular season full of ups and downs the Red Bulls began the newly introduced intermediate round in third place, then going on to drop another place. But there was no stopping Salzburg in the play-offs: after an exhausting best-of-five series in the quarter final against Villach, they left the Vienna Capitals standing in the semi-final, where they racked up four wins (best of seven). The final against Slovenian club Olimpija Ljubljana became a real thriller, which ended with the Red Bulls 4:2 ahead on wins after proving better able to hold their nerve. Salzburg therefore managed to bag the title for the second year running, the farm team's second place in the Österreichische Nationalliga also underlining a strong performance.

2008–09
The 2008–09 season saw the Red Bulls narrowly miss out on retaining their title. After an incredibly exciting finals series spanning seven games, they suffered a narrow 1–2 defeat in the final game in Klagenfurt, losing their crown to KAC. The Red Bulls nevertheless end the season with their heads held high, having played some fast-paced and powerful ice hockey with by far the youngest team in the Erste Bank Eishockey Liga and impressed an ever-increasing number of Salzburg fans, who made sure the play-off games were always a sell-out. In the second year of his tenure as head coach and sporting director, Pierre Pagé made an even bigger impression than last year: his skill for bringing a number of young, talented players from Austria and abroad together with some of Austria's strongest players – captain Thomas Koch was awarded MVP honours this season – produced a force to be reckoned with as the season progressed, the team having started the championship with an average age of just 23.8. In the context of the Red Bull Hockey Model several talented farm team players were also given their chance in the 1st division, some of them even holding their own in the finals series. The Red Bulls fielded a total of 43 players in the 1st division. The farm team, which largely comprised U-20 players this year, was knocked out in the quarter-final of the Österreichische Nationalliga by EK Zell am See.

2009–10
The 2009–10 season puts all others in the shade. In his third year with the Red Bulls, head coach and sporting director Pierre Pagé single-mindedly pursued his objectives and now the Salzburg ice hockey club has picked up no fewer than three championship titles! In September 2009 the Red Bulls won their own invitation tournament, the Red Bulls Salute, for the first time in its five-year history, beating top-flight European clubs such as CSKA Moscow in the process. In November 2009 and January 2010, Salzburg took part in their third Continental Cup, Europe's most prestigious IIHF club tournament of the season, also lifting the cup after two successful rounds in Latvia and France. The Red Bulls made it an incredible hat trick by winning the Erste Bank Eishockey Liga, celebrating their most successful season so far in their ten-year existence as a club. Thomas Koch, who takes the 2009 MVP award, lifted the cup for the first time as captain. Sterling work with the juniors as part of the Red Bull Hockey Model was rewarded with, among other things, the U-20 and U-17 championships. The Red Bulls' farm team was knocked out in the semi-finals of the Österreichische Nationalliga (2nd division) by Dornbirn, who went on to take championship honours, but continued to provide several young talented players with the ideal platform from which to develop. Record breakers: On 12 January 2010, the Red Bulls took on Jesenice in the Erste Bank Eishockey Liga, fielding a line-up whose average age was just 21.1 years. Overall, 47 Salzburg players made at least one appearance in Austria's premier division.

Honours
Austrian Hockey League:
Winners (8): 2007, 2008, 2010, 2011, 2014*, 2015, 2016, 2018*
Continental Cup:
Winners (1) : 2010
European Trophy:
Winners (1) : 2011

Players

Current roster
Updated 24 January 2023.

|}

Notable alumni

 Greger Artursson
 Josh Green
 Martin Ulrich
 Darryl Bootland
 Colton Yellow Horn
 Jay Pandolfo
 Marty Reasoner
 Ric Jackman
 Derick Brassard

References

External links

 EC Red Bull Salzburg official website
 Red Bulls Salute at icehockeylinks.net

 
1977 establishments in Austria
2000 establishments in Austria
Ice hockey teams in Austria
Austrian Hockey League teams
Red Bull sports teams
Ice hockey clubs established in 1977
Ice hockey clubs established in 2000